Highway 39 is a road on St. Thomas, USVI. Starting at Highway 42 near the Mahogany Run Golf Course, it runs in a north–south direction across the eastern portion of the island. After a brief Concurrency with Highway 40, the road ends at Highway 38 a few miles east of Charlotte Amalie.

Major Intersections

Auxiliary routes
Highway 394 is a road on St. Thomas, USVI. The road connects Highways 35 and 39 on the central part of the island.

Major Intersections

References

39